Nader Talebzadeh also known as Nader Ordoubadi was an Iranian conservative journalist and filmmaker.

Early life 
Talebzadeh was born in 1953 or 1954 in Tehran. His father Mansour Talebzadeh Ordoubadi, was a general officer serving in the Imperial Iranian Army. Several sources claimed that his father was instrumental in 1953 Iranian coup d'état, overthrowing Mohammad Mosaddegh, a claim which Talebzadeh always denied during his lifetime. Talebzadeh himself told Iranian news sources that his mother was Seyyedeh Vahideh Amir Molouk Sharafi a descendant of Ayatollah Sharafolaali Isfahani. Nasser Talebzadeh (Noah Mckay)'s funeral lists his mother as Marie Ordoubadi. Catherine Shakdam, a french journalist who spend time in Iran in close connection with Talebzadeh wrote in her opinion blog in Times of Israel that she heard rumors that Talebzadeh's mother was from a crypto-Jewish background.  The couple had two other children. Talebzadeh's brother, Nasser Ordoubadi also known as Noah A. McKay, was a medical doctor. His sister, Nini Ordoubadi lives in a barn located in East Meredith, New York with her husband Anthony Chase, and owns a tea shop named Tay Tea.

Talebzadeh immigrated to the United States in 1970 and lived in the state of Virginia. Talebzadeh told the Los Angeles Times in 2008 that he studied at the American University. Afterwards, he studied cinema at Now York City's Columbia University.

Career 
Talebzadeh returned to Iran after in 1979 to film the Iranian Revolution. He became a fixer for American media in Tehran due to his command in English language and his earlier experiences, working closely with the crew of CBS News, which at the time had about thirty to forty personnel stationed in Iran. He also established contacts in the National Radio and Television, as well as the Ministry of National Guidance. According to Hamid Naficy, Talebzadeh left CBS after he became disillusioned with media portrayal of the revolution by Western outlets.

Using his connections, he then made a 35-minute documentary named Vaqeiyat about Western bias on covering the hostage crisis, which included using juxtaposition technique to mix interviews he had made with foreign correspondents covering Iran and reports aired by their media.

During the 1990s he irregularly contributed to Sobh, an anti-intellectual publiction edited by Mohammad Nassiri.

Conference organizing 
Talebzadeh was a key organizer of several controversial conferences, including the International Conference to Review the Global Vision of the Holocaust (2006), the International Conference on Hollywoodism (2011–2013) and the New Horizon Conference (2013–2019).

U.S. federal government accused Talebzadeh of working closely with the Islamic Revolutionary Guard Corps (IRGC) and traveling across the world to recruit assets for the Quds Force under cover of inviting guests to conferences. Talebzadeh denied allegations of providing the IRGC with information. He was nonetheless put on the sanctions list by the U.S. Department of the Treasury in 2019 for "supporting intelligence and cyber targeting of U.S. persons".

According to George Michael, Talebzadeh introduced his personal friend Michael Collins Piper to Iranian President Mahmoud Ahmadinejad and the two met on the sidelines of a press conference in the New York City after the latter's speech at the United Nations. Piper was then invited to Iran by Ahmadinejad and participated in International Conference to Review the Global Vision of the Holocaust in 2006. Other figures personally in touch with Talebzadeh include Aleksandr Dugin, Ibrahim Mousawi, Louis Farrakhan and Catherine Perez-Shakdam.

Partial filmography 
 Vaqeiyat (1979) 
 Zaban-e Hal (1980s)
 Khanjar va Shaqayeq (1992), documentary series about the Bosnian War
 The Messiah (2007)
 I Was There (2008), a 9/11 conspiracy documentary
 Secret, a show on state television

Personal life 
According to John Gaffney, a classmate and friend of Talebzadeh at the Columbia University, Talebzadeh had a partially deaf girlfriend from Chicago named Randi Hoffman. New York public marriage license data show that Talebzadeh married Hoffman during the time he spent in United States. According to Hoffman's twitter page, she later accompanied him back and spent time in Iran acting as a journalist for CBS news. Talebzadeh later married twice, first to Azam Bagheri, and later in life to Zeinab Mehanna, a Lebanese woman.

Views 
Talebzadeh was politically a conservative and co-founder of the Popular Front of Islamic Revolution Forces. He was staunchly against Akbar Hashemi Rafsanjani and technocratic policies of his administration.

Though described as a proponent of anti-Americanism, it has been claimed that he held American citizenship. In 2013, Thomas Erdbrink who served as bureau chief for The New York Times in Tehran, referred to him as an "Iranian-American".

References

External links
 
 

1953 births
2022 deaths
Iranian film directors
Iranian film critics
CBS News people
Randolph–Macon College alumni
Columbia University School of the Arts alumni
Iranian expatriates in the United States
American people of Iranian descent
Popular Front of Islamic Revolution Forces politicians
Iranian columnists
Iranian individuals subject to the U.S. Department of the Treasury sanctions
Iranian conspiracy theorists
People from Tehran